The 2015 Assam State Premier League was the first season of the Assam State Premier League in its new format, and 8th as highest state-level league. The league was re-launched in May 2015 and was kicked off on 29 May, concluding with the final on 25 July.

Karbi Anglong Morning Star FC became champion of 2015 Assam State Premier League by defeating F.C. Green Valley in the final held at KASA Stadium, Diphu.

Format
As per the new format of ASPL 2015 a total of 12 city-based clubs across Assam has been divided in Two Zonal Groups - Upper Assam Zonal Group and Lower Assam Zonal Group. At the Zonal Group Stage, each club shall play all the other 5 teams in the Group twice on Home and Away basis. At the end of the Zonal Group stage, top 4 Clubs from each group shall advance to the Final stage of ASPL 2015. The Final stage shall be played on knock-out format in Home and Away basis. Once the Zonal Group stage is over, there will be a draw for the Final stage.

Key regulations
ASPL has introduced few key regulations to ensure future, all round development of the game of football in the state of Assam. As per the regulations, each team can register a maximum of 3 overseas player out of which only a maximum of 2 can be included in the playing XI. Each club shall also have to register a minimum of 6 players from its defined catchment area aged not more than 25 years and 6 Indian players aged not more than 20 years. Each club has to also include a minimum of 1 Catchment player and 1 U-20 player in its Playing XI.

As per the Regulation of ASPL 2015, each club shall be responsible to organize all of its Home matches and enjoy 70% of the gate revenue generated. The clubs shall also receive fixed assistance per match for all of its Away matches from the League.

Prize money
ASPL 2015 offers lucrative prize money for all the participating clubs and is the highest ever for any Club competition in the state of Assam. The clubs eliminated from the Zonal Group stage shall receive INR 100,000 each as prize money. The clubs eliminated in the quarter final Stage shall receive INR 150,000 each. The Clubs eliminated at the semi final stage shall receive INR 250,000 each. The runner up shall receive INR 350,000 and the ASPL 2015 Champion club shall receive a prize money of INR 500,000.

In addition, there are several other prizes on offer, such as, Golden Ball winner (Best Player), Golden Boot winner (Highest Scorer), Golden Gloves (Best Goalkeeper), Best Defender, Best Midfielder, Best Overseas Player Best U-20 Player, Best Catchment Player etc.

Teams
The list of clubs divided into two zones.

Round

Group Stage League Table

Upper Assam Zone

<div style="height:250px; overflow-y:auto; margin:0 auto; border:1px solid #BBB">

Lower Assam Zone

<div style="height:250px; overflow-y:auto; margin:0 auto; border:1px solid #BBB">

Knockout phase

Bracket

Quarter–finals

The first legs were played on 7 and 8 July, and the second legs were played on 11 and 12 July 2015.

First leg

Second leg

Semi–finals

The first legs was played on 15 and 16 July, and the second legs was played on 18 and 19 July 2015.

First leg

Second leg

Final

The final was played on 25 July 2015 at KASA Stadium, Diphu.

Statistics

Top scorers

Awards
List of awards winners.

Club awards

List of Individual Awards Winner

See also

 Assam State Premier League
 Bordoloi Trophy
 Assam Football Association
 All India Football Federation
 Green Valley F.C.

References

External links 

 
 Assam State Premier League 2015 – The Home of Indian Football

Assam State Premier League
4
4